North Guwahati is northern part of the city of Guwahati and a town area committee in Kamrup Rural district in the Indian state of Assam.This town abounds in historical places and picnic spots. National Highway 27 passes through North Guwahati. Amingaon neighbourhood is district headquarter of Kamrup Rural district.

History
North Guwahati is also known as Durjaya, was capital of the ancient state of Kamarupa under Pala dynasty. In early medieval times, the area was known as Kamarupa Nagara. North Guwahati possesses temples, roads, bridges, fortifications, and moats which are of ancient origin. There are two temples on the Aswakranta hill. The upper temple contains the image of Vishnu lying on Ananta-Sajya. It is one of the finest specimens of sculptural skill in Kamarupa about the beginning of the twelfth century.

The western part of the town is called Sil-Sako because it still contains a small stone-built bridge over a stream. The eastern part is known as Raja-duar (king's gate), which shows that the Raja's palace was there. The second copper-plate of Dharma Pala was found in the village of Rangmahal about two miles to the north of Raja-duar. This is another indication that the capital was then at North-Guwahati. In Rajaduur itself exists the rock-inscription, dated 1127 Saka, proclaiming the destruction of the Turkish army of Muhammad bin Bakhtiyar Khalji.

North Guwahati continued to be the capital from the time of Dharma Pala till about 1260 A.D. when the seat of government was transferred to further west. The stone-slab inscription found on the hill in Raja-duar, abutting on the Brahmaputra, it can found that this small hill was the abode of Sri Chandra Bharati, a well-known Kamrupi poet of the sixteenth century.

Geography

Demography
 India census, North Guwahati had a population of 16,131. Males constitute 53% of the population and females 47%. North Guwahati has an average literacy rate of 73%, higher than the national average of 59.5%: male literacy is 78%, and female literacy is 68%. In North Guwahati, 10% of the population is under 6 years of age.

Education
The Indian Institute of Technology, Guwahati, the sixth in the country, was set up in the year 1994. Covering 285 hectares of area, it is situated here amidst scenic hills and lakes. It is the sole Indian Institutes of Technology in the region. Along with there are also some renowned education institutes like North Gauhati College, K.V. IIT, St. Anthony's School Abhaypur, Faculty Higher Secondary School, Amingaon, Sarla Birla Gyan Jyoti, Shankar Dev Sishu Niketan, and some other primary institution, etc.

Places of interest
North Guwahati abounds with historical temples like Dirgheshwari temple, Doul Govinda Temple, Janardan Temple, Mani-Karneswar Temple, Aswaklanta Temple, Rudreswar Temple and Auniati Satra. The Kanai Barasibowa Rock Inscription of the Saka year 1127 is situated in the proximity of the Doul Govinda Temple. Surrounded by evergreen trees and a fast-flowing brook, it is a beautiful spot for a picnic. The Manikoreneswar Temple is situated on a hill on the back of the river Brahmaputra. Aswaklanta, a historical place, stands on the bank of the river Brahmaputra.

Commerce
The town is a major commercial hub, with major industries, are located here alongside numerous factories. One of the major commercial hubs of the region is college chowk, where one can find all the utilities and amenities.

Notable peoples
Anindita Paul, singer
Anundoram Borooah, Lawyer and Scholar

References

Cities and towns in Kamrup district